Alte Burg, Alteburg or Burgstall Alte Burg refers to the name or nickname of various castles, castle ruins, castle sites and hillforts or ringworks:

Germany
 Alte Burg (Altenstein), hillfort site near Altenstein (Maroldsweisach), county of Haßberge, Bavaria
 Alte Burg (Aull), water castle in Aull, Rhein-Lahn-Kreis, Rhineland-Palatinate
 Alte Burg (Bad Münstereifel), hillfort site near Bad Münstereifel, county of Euskirchen, North Rhine-Westphalia
 Alte Burg (Berka vor dem Hainich), ramparts in the Hainich, near Berka, Wartburgkreis, Thuringia
 Alte Burg (Beuggen), castle site near Rheinfelden, county of Lörrach, Baden-Württemberg
 Alte Burg (Boppard), castle  in Boppard, Rhein-Hunsrück-Kreis, Rhineland-Palatinate
 Alte Burg (Bühle), castle site near Bühle (Northeim), county of Northeim, Niedersachsen
 Alte Burg (Burgsinn), castle ruins in Burgsinn, county of Main-Spessart, Bavaria
 Alte Burg (Demmingen), castle site near Demmingen (Dischingen), county of Heidenheim, Baden-Württemberg
 Alte Burg (Einöd), castle site (motte and bailey castle) near Einöd, Saarpfalz-Kreis, Saarland
 Alte Burg (Elbtal), castle ruins near Elbgrund (Elbtal), county of Limburg-Weilburg, Hesse
 Alte Burg (Gimmeldingen), castle ruins in Gimmeldingen in the borough of Neustadt an der Weinstraße, Rhineland-Palatinate
 Alte Burg (Hafenpreppach), castle site near Hafenpreppach (Maroldsweisach), county of Haßberge, Bavaria
 Alte Burg (Harrbach), castle ruins near Gemünden, county of Main-Spessart, Bavaria
 Alte Burg (Hummertsried) (Hummersried), castle site near Hummertsried (Eberhardzell), county of Biberach, Baden-Württemberg
 Alte Burg (Koblenz), water castle in the city of Koblenz in Rhineland-Palatinate
 Alte Burg (Labach), castle site near Labach (Saarwellingen), county of Saarlouis, Saarland
 Alte Burg (Lage), castle site in Lage, county of Lippe, North Rhine-Westphalia
 Alte Burg (Langenenslingen), Celtic hill settlement near Emerfeld (Langenenslingen), county of Biberach, Baden-Württemberg
 Alte Burg (Laudert), castle site in Laudert, Rhein-Hunsrück-Kreis, Rhineland-Palatinate
 Alte Burg (Lauffen am Neckar), castle site in Lauffen am Neckar, county of Heilbronn, Baden-Württemberg
 Alte Burg (Lipporn), castle ruins near Lipporn, Rhein-Lahn-Kreis, Rhineland-Palatinate
 Alte Burg (Lispenhausen), castle site near Lispenhausen (Rotenburg an der Fulda), county of Hersfeld-Rotenburg, Hesse
 Alte Burg (Lommersdorf), castle site near Lommersdorf (Blankenheim), county of Euskirchen, North Rhine-Westphalia
 Ringwall Alteburg (Lorsbach), castle site near Lorsbach (Hofheim), Main-Taunus-Kreis, Hesse
 Alte Burg (Neuburg an der Donau), castle ruins near Neuburg an der Donau, county of Neuburg-Schrobenhausen, Bavaria
 Alte Burg (Netphen), castle site near Dreis-Tiefenbach (Netphen), county of Siegen-Wittgenstein, North Rhine-Westphalia
 Alte Burg (Nettersheim), castle site in Nettersheim, county of Euskirchen, North Rhine-Westphalia
 Alte Burg Neustadt-Glewe, castle  in Neustadt-Glewe, county of Ludwigslust-Parchim, Mecklenburg-Vorpommern
 Alte Burg (Nieder-Beerbach), castle site near Nieder-Beerbach (Mühltal), county of Darmstadt-Dieburg, Hesse
 Alte Burg (Nörvenich), castle ruins near Nörvenich, county of Düren, North Rhine-Westphalia
 Alte Burg (Osterode), castle ruins near Osterode, county of Osterode am Harz, Niedersachsen
 Alte Burg (Padberg), castle ruins near Padberg (Marsberg), Hochsauerlandkreis, North Rhine-Westphalia
 Alte Burg Penzlin, castle  in Penzlin, county of Mecklenburgische Seenplatte, Mecklenburg-Vorpommern
 Alteburg (Reutlingen), castle ruins in Reutlingen, Baden-Württemberg
 Alte Burg (Rotenhain), castle ruins (motte and bailey) near Rotenhain in the Westerwald hills, Westerwaldkreis, Rhineland-Palatinate
 Alte Burg (Unterrath), castle site (motte and bailey) in Unterrath in the city of Düsseldorf, North Rhine-Westphalia
 Alte Burg (Wewer), water castle in Paderborn-Wewer, North Rhine-Westphalia
 Alteburg (Essen), hillfort site in Werden (Essen), North Rhine-Westphalia
 Alteburg (Kohden), castle site in Kohden (Nidda), Wetteraukreis, Hesse
 Turmhügel Alteburg, castle site near Röttingen, county of Würzburg, Bavaria

Alte Burg as an alternative name:
 Alsterburg (Alte Burg), castle site in Hamburg
 Entenstein Castle (Alte Burg), castle site near Rodalben, county of Südwestpfalz, Rhineland-Palatinate
 Hardenberg Castle (Velbert) (Alte Burg), castle site between Neviges and Tönisheide (Velbert), county of Mettmann, North Rhine-Westphalia
 Heimburg Castle (Alteburg, Altenburg), castle ruins near Heimburg (Blankenburg), county of Harz, Saxony-Anhalt
 Longuich Castle (Alte Burg), fortified house in Longuich, county of Trier-Saarburg, Rhineland-Palatinate
 Meersburg Castle (Alte Burg), castle ruins in Meersburg am Bodensee, Bodenseekreis, Baden-Württemberg
 Trochtelfingen Castle (Alte Burg), castle ruins near Trochtelfingen, county of Reutlingen, Baden-Württemberg
 Alte Burg (Althausen), castle site near Althausen (Münnerstadt), county of Bad Kissingen, Bavaria
 Alte Burg (Aurachtal), castle site near Aurachtal, county of Erlangen-Höchstadt, Bavaria
 Alte Burg (Unterregenbach), castle site near Unterregenbach (Langenburg), county of Schwäbisch Hall, Baden-Württemberg
 Obere Burg (Zwingenberg) (older name Alte Burg), castle site in Zwingenberg, county of Bergstraße, Hesse
 Ringwall Wirtheim (Alte Burg), lost hillfort site near Biebergemünd-Wirtheim, Main-Kinzig-Kreis, Hesse
 Rüdenburg (Alte Burg), castle rest near Arnsberg, Hochsauerlandkreis, North Rhine-Westphalia

Austria
 Gmünd Castle (Alte Burg), castle ruins in Gmünd, district of Spittal an der Drau, Carinthia, Austria

Alte Burg or Alteburg is the name or nickname of Roman camps (Kastellen) and fortified sites:
 Kastell Arnsburg-Alteburg, Roman Limes camp (area monument) near Lich, county of Gießen, Hesse
 Kastell Alteburg, Roman Limes camp (area monument) near Heftrich (Idstein), Rheingau-Taunus-Kreis, Hesse
 Flottenkastell Alteburg, Roman camp (area monument) near Marienburg (Cologne), North Rhine-Westphalia
 Römerlager Oberbrechen (Alteburg), lost Roman camp near Oberbrechen (Brechen), county of Limburg-Weilburg, Hesse
 Alteburg (Biebergemünd), Celtic settlement and fortifications near Biebergemünd, Main-Kinzig-Kreis, Hesse
 Alteburg (Zell), Late Roman hillfort near Zell an der Mosel (Hunsrück), county of Cochem-Zell, Rhineland-Palatinate

Alte Burg or Alteburg is the name of the following mountains and hills:
 Alte Burg (Afholderbach) (633.0 m), near Afholderbach (Netphen), Rothaar Mountains, county of Siegen-Wittgenstein, North Rhine-Westphalia
 Alteburg (Arnstadt) (398.2 m), near Arnstadt, spur of the Plateau of Gossel in the Ohrdruf Plateau, Ilm-Kreis, Thuringia
 Alte Burg (Gräfenroda) (639.6 m), near Gräfenroda, Thuringian Forest, spur of the Arlesberg (650.8 m), Ilm-Kreis, Thuringia
 Alteburg (Hörre) (445.1 m), near Ballersbach (Mittenaar), highest point in the Hörre, Gladenbach Uplands, Lahn-Dill-Kreis, Hesse
 Alte Burg (Kunst Wittgenstein) (554.0 m), near Kunst Wittgenstein (Bad Laasphe), Rothaar Mountains, county of Siegen-Wittgenstein, North Rhine-Westphalia
 Alteburg (Soonwald) (620.5 m), near Pferdsfeld (Bad Sobernheim), Soonwald, county of Bad Kreuznach, Rhineland-Palatinate
 Alteburg (Vogelsberg) (616.8 m), near Kaulstoß (Schotten), Vogelsberg, Vogelsbergkreis, Hesse
 Alte Burg (Arnsberg) (303 m), also Römberg, site of the Rüdenburg near Arnsberg, Hochsauerlandkreis, North Rhine-Westphalia

Alte Burg is the name of a former princely estate:
 former Slavic princely estate of Starigard ("Alte Burg"), from the location name Aldinborg and which finally became Oldenburg in Holstein, see Oldenburg in Holstein

Alte Burg or Alteburg may also refer to:
 Alte Burg (nature reserve), nature reserve in Ballenstedt, county of Harz, Saxony-Anhalt
 Alte Burg Tunnel, tunnel on the Bundesautobahn A 71 (motorway) near the Gräfenroda junction, Ilm-Kreis, Thuringia
 former wood loading area of an abandoned section of the Nidder Valley Railway, Hesse
 Barony of Alteburg, Baden-Württemberg

See also 
 Altburg (disambiguation)
 Altenburg (disambiguation)
 Altes Schloss (disambiguation)